René de Galard de Béarn, marquis de Brassac (1699 – October 1771), member of the noble family de Galard, was a French soldier and amateur composer of the Baroque era. He wrote two operas and a collection of cantatas. He was a cavalry officer, appointed maréchal de camp (major-general) in 1748 and lieutenant-general in 1758.

Operas
L'empire de l'amour (ballet héroïque, 1733; expanded version, 1741)
Léandre et Héro (tragédie en musique, 1750)

Sources
Le magazine de l'opéra baroque by Jean-Claude Brenac (in French)

1699 births
1771 deaths
French Baroque composers
French male classical composers
French opera composers
Male opera composers
18th-century classical composers
18th-century French composers
18th-century French male musicians
17th-century male musicians